This is a list of 1358 species in Tabanus, a genus of horseflies in the family Tabanidae.

Tabanus species

A

Tabanus aaptus Fairchild, 1985
Tabanus aar Philip, 1941
Tabanus abactor Philip, 1936
Tabanus abaculus Philip, 1960
Tabanus abauristriatus Philip, 1960
Tabanus abbasalis Philip, 1960
Tabanus abbreviatus (Bigot, 1892)
Tabanus abditus Philip, 1941
Tabanus abdominalis Fabricius, 1805
Tabanus abjanensis Ježek, Tkoc & Harten, 2017
Tabanus abscondens Walker, 1860
Tabanus acallosus Philip, 1961
Tabanus acallus Szilády, 1926
Tabanus accensus Austen, 1920
Tabanus accipiter Szilády, 1923
Tabanus acer Brèthes, 1910
Tabanus acuminaris Philip, 1960
Tabanus acutus (Bigot, 1892)
Tabanus adhabarensis Matsumura & Takahasi, 1976
Tabanus adiastolus Fairchild, 1986
Tabanus admelanopygus Philip, 1974
Tabanus administrans Schiner, 1868
Tabanus aegrotus Osten Sacken, 1877
Tabanus aeneus Surcouf, 1907
Tabanus agnoscibilis Austen, 1922
Tabanus aidini Kröber, 1928
Tabanus alatocinereus Dias, 1974
Tabanus albicinctus Schuurmans Stekhoven, 1926
Tabanus albicuspis Wang, 1985
Tabanus albifacies Loew, 1856
Tabanus albifrons Szilády, 1914
Tabanus albilinea Walker, 1848
Tabanus albitibialis Macquart, 1838
Tabanus albitriangularis Schuurmans Stekhoven, 1926
Tabanus albocirculus Hine, 1907
Tabanus albocostatus (Bigot, 1892)
Tabanus albocreus Philip, 1974
Tabanus albofasciatus Ricardo, 1911
Tabanus albopunctatus Schuurmans Stekhoven, 1926
Tabanus albosetosus Coher, 1985
Tabanus algeriensis Peus, 1980
Tabanus altermaculatus Ricardo, 1913
Tabanus alticola Philip, 1959
Tabanus alumnus Burton, 1978
Tabanus alvarengai Schacht, 1987
Tabanus amaenus Walker, 1848
Tabanus amamiensis Hayakawa, Suzuki & Nagashima, 1981
Tabanus amapaensis Fairchild, 1961
Tabanus americanus Forster, 1771
Tabanus amoenatus Séguy, 1934
Tabanus anabates Philip, 1960
Tabanus anatolicus Olsufiev, Moucha & Chvála, 1967
Tabanus andamanensis Kapoor, Grewal & Sharma, 1991
Tabanus andamanicus (Bigot, 1892)
Tabanus anderssoni Philip, 1972
Tabanus angustilimbatus Senior-White, 1924
Tabanus angustipalpis Schuurmans Stekhoven, 1926
Tabanus angustistriatus Schuurmans Stekhoven, 1926
Tabanus angustitriangularis Schuurmans Stekhoven, 1926
Tabanus angustiventer Schuurmans Stekhoven, 1926
Tabanus angustofrons Wang, 1985
Tabanus angustus Macquart, 1838
Tabanus aniptus Fairchild, 1976
Tabanus annamensis Philip, 1960
Tabanus annamiticus Surcouf, 1911
Tabanus annamitus (Bigot, 1892)
Tabanus anomalus Philip, 1959
Tabanus ansarii Abbassian-Lintzen, 1960
Tabanus antarcticus Linnaeus, 1758
Tabanus antennarum (Kröber, 1936)
Tabanus anthrax Olsufiev, 1937
Tabanus antunesi Fairchild, 1985
Tabanus apicalis Wiedemann, 1828
Tabanus approximatus Oldroyd, 1949
Tabanus aquilus Surcouf, 1907
Tabanus arabicus Macquart, 1839
Tabanus aranti Hays, 1961
Tabanus arctus Wang, 1982
Tabanus ardalus Philip, 1960
Tabanus ardens Wiedemann, 1821
Tabanus arenicolor Peus, 1980
Tabanus arenivagus Austen, 1920
Tabanus arfaai Abbassian-Lintzen, 1966
Tabanus argentatus (Szilády, 1926)
Tabanus argenteomaculatus (Kröber, 1928)
Tabanus argenteus Surcouf, 1907
Tabanus argentifrons Walker, 1848
Tabanus argentisignatus Schuurmans Stekhoven, 1926
Tabanus argentivittatus Fairchild, 1976
Tabanus arisanus Shiraki, 1918
Tabanus armeniacus (Kröber, 1928)
Tabanus armenicus Szilády, 1926
Tabanus arnaudi Philip, 1978
Tabanus atamuradovi Dolin & Andreeva, 1986
Tabanus atratoides Burger, 1988
Tabanus atratus Fabricius, 1775
Tabanus atrimaculatus Schuurmans Stekhoven, 1932
Tabanus atrimanus Loew, 1858
Tabanus atripilosus Schuurmans Stekhoven, 1926
Tabanus atripunctatus Schuurmans Stekhoven, 1926
Tabanus atrisignatus Schuurmans Stekhoven, 1926
Tabanus atristylatus Burger, 1988
Tabanus atriventer Schuurmans Stekhoven, 1926
Tabanus atrohirtus Ricardo, 1911
Tabanus atropathenicus Olsufiev, 1937
Tabanus atropilosus Burger, 1988
Tabanus attenuatus Walker, 1848
Tabanus attenuis Philip, 1959
Tabanus aublanti Toumanoff, 1953
Tabanus audyi Philip, 1960
Tabanus aurantium Philip, 1957
Tabanus aurepiloides Xu & Deng, 1990
Tabanus auribundus Schuurmans Stekhoven, 1926
Tabanus auricauda Philip, 1956
Tabanus auricingulatus Schuurmans Stekhoven, 1926
Tabanus auricircus Philip, 1979
Tabanus aurifer Schuurmans Stekhoven, 1926
Tabanus auriflamma Walker, 1848
Tabanus aurilineatus Schuurmans Stekhoven, 1926
Tabanus auripilosus Philip, 1959
Tabanus auripunctatus Macquart, 1839
Tabanus aurisegmentatus Schuurmans Stekhoven, 1932
Tabanus aurisetosus Toumanoff, 1950
Tabanus aurisparsus Schuurmans Stekhoven, 1926
Tabanus auristriatus Ricardo, 1911
Tabanus auriventer Schuurmans Stekhoven, 1926
Tabanus aurivittatus Ricardo, 1913
Tabanus aurora Macquart, 1838
Tabanus aurotestaceus Walker, 1854
Tabanus australicus Taylor, 1919
Tabanus autumnalis Linnaeus, 1761
Tabanus avittatus Schuurmans Stekhoven, 1926

B

Tabanus bactrianus Olsufiev, 1937
Tabanus baguiensis Philip, 1959
Tabanus bakeri Philip, 1959
Tabanus balabacensis Chvála & Lyneborg, 1970
Tabanus ballmeri Burton, 1978
Tabanus baohaii Xu & Liu, 1980
Tabanus baohaii Xu & Sun, 2008
Tabanus baojiensis Xu & Liu, 1980
Tabanus barbarus Coquebert, 1804
Tabanus barbatus Thunberg, 1789
Tabanus barclayi Austen, 1912
Tabanus barnesi Austen, 1922
Tabanus basalis Macquart, 1838
Tabanus bashiri Abro, 1994
Tabanus basilaris Kröber, 1931
Tabanus beneficus Wang, 1982
Tabanus bequaertianus Fain, 1949
Tabanus beshkentica Baratov, 1980
Tabanus besti Surcouf, 1907
Tabanus besti var. arbucklei Austen, 1912
Tabanus bewanensis Oldroyd, 1964
Tabanus biatripunctatus Schuurmans Stekhoven, 1926
Tabanus bicoloratus Philip, 1962
Tabanus bifarius Loew, 1858
Tabanus bifloccus Hine, 1925
Tabanus bigoti Bellardi, 1859
Tabanus biguttatus Wiedemann, 1830
Tabanus bilateralis Schuurmans Stekhoven, 1926
Tabanus billingtoni Newstead, Dutton & Todd, 1907
Tabanus bilorus Oldroyd, 1963
Tabanus bimini Philip, 1957
Tabanus birdiei Whitney, 1914
Tabanus birmanicus (Bigot, 1892)
Tabanus bishoppi Stone, 1933
Tabanus bivari Dias, 1985
Tabanus boharti Philip, 1950
Tabanus bombyaensis Schuurmans Stekhoven, 1926
Tabanus borealoriens Burton, 1978
Tabanus boueti Surcouf, 1907
Tabanus bovinus Linnaeus, 1758
Tabanus brancoi Dias, 1989
Tabanus brassofortei Dias, 1980
Tabanus brevicallus Philip, 1959
Tabanus brevifrons Kröber, 1931
Tabanus brevitrianguliferus Kröber, 1931
Tabanus briani Leclercq, 1962
Tabanus brincki Philip, 1973
Tabanus brochei Cruz & García, 1974
Tabanus brodeni Bequaert, 1913
Tabanus bromiolus Szilády, 1923
Tabanus bromius Linnaeus, 1758
Tabanus bromius var. flavofemoratus Strobl, 1909
Tabanus brumpti Surcouf, 1907
Tabanus brunneicollis Hine & Bequaert, 1932
Tabanus brunneocallosus Olsufiev, 1936
Tabanus brunneothorax Schuurmans Stekhoven, 1924
Tabanus brunneus Thunberg, 1827
Tabanus brunnipennis Ricardo, 1911
Tabanus brunnipes Schuurmans Stekhoven, 1926
Tabanus brunniventer Schuurmans Stekhoven, 1926
Tabanus bubali Doleschall, 1856
Tabanus bubalophilus Schuurmans Stekhoven, 1926
Tabanus bubbermani Nieschulz, 1927
Tabanus bucolicus Schiner, 1868
Tabanus budda Portschinsky, 1887
Tabanus budongoensis Crosskey, 1965
Tabanus burgeri (Philip, 1978)
Tabanus burmanensis Schuurmans Stekhoven, 1926

C

Tabanus caduceus Burton, 1978
Tabanus caenosus Burger, 1974
Tabanus caerulescens Macquart, 1838
Tabanus calabyi Mackerras, 1971
Tabanus calcarius Xu & Liao, 1984
Tabanus calens Linnaeus, 1758
Tabanus calidus Walker, 1850
Tabanus caligneus Philip, 1974
Tabanus callogaster Wang, 1988
Tabanus cambodianus Philip, 1960
Tabanus cambodiensis Toumanoff, 1953
Tabanus camelarius Austen, 1911
Tabanus campechianus Townsend, 1897
Tabanus campestris Brèthes, 1910
Tabanus candidus Ricardo, 1913
Tabanus canipalpis (Bigot, 1892)
Tabanus canipus Schuurmans Stekhoven, 1926
Tabanus canus Karsch, 1879
Tabanus capelai Dias, 1992
Tabanus catenatus Walker, 1848
Tabanus caucasius Kröber, 1925
Tabanus cayensis Fairchild, 1935
Tabanus cazieri Philip, 1954
Tabanus cementus Xu & Liao, 1984
Tabanus centroafricanus Dias, 1996
Tabanus cepuricus Surcouf, 1922
Tabanus cervinus Kröber, 1929
Tabanus ceylonicus Schiner, 1868
Tabanus chalcothrix Fairchild, 1961
Tabanus charrua Coscarón, 1980
Tabanus chekiangensis Ôuchi, 1943
Tabanus cheliopterus Rondani, 1850
Tabanus chenfui Xu & Sun, 2013
Tabanus chentangensis Zhu & Xu, 1995
Tabanus chicoi Tendeiro, 1965
Tabanus chinensis Ôuchi, 1943
Tabanus chloropsis Schuurmans Stekhoven, 1926
Tabanus choiseulensis Mackerras, 1972
Tabanus chosenensis Murdoch & Takahasi, 1969
Tabanus choumarae Leclercq, 1967
Tabanus christophi Kröber, 1928
Tabanus chrysogaster Schuurmans Stekhoven, 1926
Tabanus chrysoleucus Walker, 1854
Tabanus chrysurinus (Enderlein, 1925)
Tabanus chrysurus Loew, 1858
Tabanus cincta Fabricius, 1794
Tabanus cinerescens Macleay, 1826
Tabanus cingulatus Thunberg, 1827
Tabanus cinnamoneus Doleschall, 1858
Tabanus circumalbatus Schuurmans Stekhoven, 1932
Tabanus citripilosus Schuurmans Stekhoven, 1926
Tabanus claripennis (Bigot, 1892)
Tabanus claritibialis Ricardo, 1908
Tabanus clenchi Bequaert, 1940
Tabanus cnemidotus Philip, 1959
Tabanus cneus Philip, 1974
Tabanus coarctatus Stone, 1935
Tabanus cohaerens Walker, 1865
Tabanus colombensis Macquart, 1846
Tabanus columbus Fairchild, 1942
Tabanus combustus (Bigot, 1891)
Tabanus comitans Wiedemann, 1828
Tabanus commixtus Walker, 1860
Tabanus comosus Stone, 1944
Tabanus concolor Walker, 1848
Tabanus concurrens Walker, 1858
Tabanus conformis Walker, 1848
Tabanus confusiens Philip, 1959
Tabanus congoicola Bequaert, 1930
Tabanus congoiensis Ricardo, 1908
Tabanus conicus (Bigot, 1892)
Tabanus coniformis Ricardo, 1908
Tabanus coninckae Dias, 1993
Tabanus conius Philip, 1959
Tabanus consanguineus Macquart, 1838
Tabanus conspicuus Ricardo, 1908
Tabanus conterminus Walker, 1850
Tabanus copemani Austen, 1912
Tabanus corax Loew, 1863
Tabanus cordiger Meigen & Wiedemann, 1820
Tabanus cordigeroides Surcouf, 1923
Tabanus coreanus Shiraki, 1932
Tabanus corone Osten Sacken, 1886
Tabanus corpulentus Brèthes, 1910
Tabanus craverii Bellardi, 1859
Tabanus crocitinctipennis Schuurmans Stekhoven, 1926
Tabanus crocodilinus Austen, 1912
Tabanus crosskeyi Tendeiro, 1965
Tabanus cruzesilvai Dias, 1980
Tabanus cubensis Cruz & García, 1974
Tabanus cuculus Szilády, 1923
Tabanus cuisancei Dias, 1996
Tabanus curticornis Kröber, 1931
Tabanus curtus Hine, 1920
Tabanus cyclops Szilády, 1926
Tabanus cyclopus Philip, 1961
Tabanus cylindricallosus Schuurmans Stekhoven, 1926
Tabanus cylindrocallus Wang, 1988
Tabanus cymatophorus Osten Sacken, 1876

D-E

Tabanus daedalus (Stone, 1938)
Tabanus daishojii Murdoch & Takahasi, 1969
Tabanus daohaoi Xu, 2005
Tabanus darimonti Leclercq, 1964
Tabanus darlingtoni Bequaert, 1940
Tabanus davidsoni Taylor, 1919
Tabanus decipiens (Kröber, 1928)
Tabanus decoratus Szilády, 1926
Tabanus defilippii Bellardi, 1859
Tabanus demellonis Senior-White, 1924
Tabanus denshamii Austen, 1908
Tabanus denticulatus Ricardo, 1913
Tabanus destructus Szilády, 1926
Tabanus dietrichi Pechuman, 1956
Tabanus discifer Walker, 1850
Tabanus discors Burton, 1978
Tabanus discrepans Ricardo, 1911
Tabanus discus Wiedemann, 1828
Tabanus dissimilis Ricardo, 1911
Tabanus distinctus Ricardo, 1908
Tabanus diversifrons Ricardo, 1911
Tabanus diversus Ricardo, 1908
Tabanus divulsus Suh, Choi & Kwon, 2003
Tabanus dolini Ivanishchuk, 1986
Tabanus dominicanus Kröber, 1931
Tabanus dominus Datta & Das, 1978
Tabanus donaldsoni Carter, 1912
Tabanus doreicus Walker, 1861
Tabanus dorsifer Walker, 1860
Tabanus dorsifloccus Szilády, 1926
Tabanus dorsiger Wiedemann, 1821
Tabanus dorsivitta Walker, 1850
Tabanus dorsobimaculatus Macquart, 1850
Tabanus dorsomaculatus Macquart, 1847
Tabanus dorsonotatus Macquart, 1847
Tabanus duckei Fairchild, 1985
Tabanus dunni Fairchild, 1942
Tabanus dzhafarovi Khudaverdiev & Dzhafarov, 1974
Tabanus eadsi Philip, 1962
Tabanus effilatanus Philip, 1959
Tabanus effilatus Schuurmans Stekhoven, 1926
Tabanus eggeri var. prometheus Szilády, 1923
Tabanus ekor Al-Talafha, Yaakop & Idris, 2017
Tabanus eldridgei Fairchild, 1973
Tabanus elongatus Wiedemann, 1828
Tabanus enanus Fairchild, 1942
Tabanus endymion Osten Sacken, 1878
Tabanus equicinctus Schuurmans Stekhoven, 1926
Tabanus erebus Osten Sacken, 1886
Tabanus erythraeus (Bigot, 1892)
Tabanus euphanes Surcouf, 1922
Tabanus eurycerus Philip, 1937
Tabanus eurytopus Burton, 1978
Tabanus exagens Walker, 1864
Tabanus excelsus Ricardo, 1913
Tabanus exclusus Pandellé, 1883
Tabanus exilipalpis Stone, 1938
Tabanus exoticus Ricardo, 1913
Tabanus explicatus Walker, 1854
Tabanus expulsus Walker, 1854
Tabanus extricans Walker, 1861

F-G

Tabanus factiosus Walker, 1859
Tabanus faini Oldroyd, 1954
Tabanus fairchildi Stone, 1938
Tabanus falviscutellus Philip, 1962
Tabanus fascius Philip, 1960
Tabanus felderi Wulp, 1885
Tabanus femoralis Kröber, 1931
Tabanus fijianus Ricardo, 1914
Tabanus filipjevi Olsufiev, 1936
Tabanus firmus Burton, 1978
Tabanus flammeus Schuurmans Stekhoven, 1926
Tabanus flaviannulatus Schuurmans Stekhoven, 1932
Tabanus flavicapitis Wang & Liu, 1977
Tabanus flavicornis Schuurmans Stekhoven, 1926
Tabanus flavicoxa Oldroyd, 1954
Tabanus flavimarginatus Schuurmans Stekhoven, 1926
Tabanus flavimedius Schuurmans Stekhoven, 1926
Tabanus flavioculatus Toumanoff, 1950
Tabanus flavipennis Ricardo, 1913
Tabanus flavipilosus Schuurmans Stekhoven, 1926
Tabanus flavipus Schuurmans Stekhoven, 1926
Tabanus flaviscutellatus Schuurmans Stekhoven, 1926
Tabanus flaviscutellus Philip, 1962
Tabanus flavissimus Ricardo, 1911
Tabanus flavistriatus Schuurmans Stekhoven, 1926
Tabanus flavitibiatus Schuurmans Stekhoven, 1926
Tabanus flavitriangularis Schuurmans Stekhoven, 1926
Tabanus flavivittatus Schuurmans Stekhoven, 1926
Tabanus flavohirtus Philip, 1960
Tabanus flavothorax Ricardo, 1911
Tabanus flexilis Walker, 1859
Tabanus flocculus Bequaert, 1940
Tabanus fontinalis Schuurmans Stekhoven, 1926
Tabanus formosiensis Ricardo, 1911
Tabanus fortis Fairchild, 1961
Tabanus fossilis Grabenhorst, 1985
Tabanus fragai Dias, 1955
Tabanus fraseri Austen, 1925
Tabanus fratellus Williston, 1887
Tabanus fraternus Macquart, 1846
Tabanus fronto Osten Sacken, 1876
Tabanus fujianensis Xu & Xu, 1993
Tabanus fullo Walker, 1850
Tabanus fulvicallus Philip, 1931
Tabanus fulvicapillus Carter, 1912
Tabanus fulvicinctus Ricardo, 1914
Tabanus fulvilinearis Philip, 1960
Tabanus fulvilineis Philip, 1957
Tabanus fulvilineus Hayakawa & Takahasi, 1983
Tabanus fulvimedioides Shiraki, 1918
Tabanus fulvissimus Rondani, 1875
Tabanus fulvulus Wiedemann, 1828
Tabanus fulvulus var. pallidescens Philip, 1936
Tabanus fumidus Austen, 1923
Tabanus fumifer Walker, 1856
Tabanus fumipennis Wiedemann, 1828
Tabanus fumomarginatus Hine, 1920
Tabanus funebris Macquart, 1846
Tabanus furunculigenus Doleschall, 1858
Tabanus furunculus Williston, 1901
Tabanus furvicaudus Xu, 1981
Tabanus fuscibarbus Schuurmans Stekhoven, 1926
Tabanus fuscicauda (Bigot, 1892)
Tabanus fuscicornis Ricardo, 1911
Tabanus fuscicostatus Hine, 1906
Tabanus fuscifrons Schuurmans Stekhoven, 1926
Tabanus fuscipleuris Oldroyd, 1954
Tabanus fuscithorax Schuurmans Stekhoven, 1926
Tabanus fusciventer Schuurmans Stekhoven, 1926
Tabanus fuscofasciatus Macquart, 1838
Tabanus fuscomaculatus Ricardo, 1911
Tabanus fuscomaculatus var. unisignatus Szilády, 1926
Tabanus fuscomarginatus Ricardo, 1908
Tabanus fusconervosus Macquart, 1838
Tabanus fuscopunctatus Macquart, 1850
Tabanus fuscotibialis Elsen, 1989
Tabanus fuscoventris Xu, 1981
Tabanus fuscus Wiedemann, 1819
Tabanus fuzhouensis Xu & Xu, 1995
Tabanus fuzouensis Xu & Xu, 1995
Tabanus galloisi Kono & Takahasi, 1939
Tabanus geminus Szilády, 1923
Tabanus geniculatus Wulp, 1881
Tabanus geographicus Burton, 1978
Tabanus gibensis Turnbull, Taylor & Smith, 1992
Tabanus gilanus Townsend, 1897
Tabanus gilingilensis Mackerras, 1962
Tabanus gilvellus Philip, 1960
Tabanus gilvilineis Philip, 1960
Tabanus gilvus Schuurmans Stekhoven, 1926
Tabanus gladiator Stone, 1935
Tabanus glaucomaculis Philip, 1978
Tabanus glauconotatus Philip, 1954
Tabanus glaucus Wiedemann, 1819
Tabanus golovi Olsufiev, 1936
Tabanus gonghaiensis Xu, 1979
Tabanus gracilicornis Hine, 1925
Tabanus gracilis Wiedemann, 1828
Tabanus grandicauda Xu, 1979
Tabanus grandis Szilády, 1923
Tabanus granti Toumanoff, 1950
Tabanus gratus Loew, 1858
Tabanus gressitti Mackerras, 1972
Tabanus griseifacies Schuurmans Stekhoven, 1926
Tabanus griseilineis Philip, 1960
Tabanus griseipalpis Schuurmans Stekhoven, 1926
Tabanus griseithorax Schuurmans Stekhoven, 1926
Tabanus griseoscutellatus Kröber, 1924
Tabanus grunini Olsufiev, 1967
Tabanus guapiensis Wilkerson, 1979
Tabanus guatemalanus Hine, 1906
Tabanus guineensis Wiedemann, 1824
Tabanus guizhouensis Chen & Xu, 1992
Tabanus guyanensis Macquart, 1846
Tabanus guyonae (Surcouf, 1922)
Tabanus gymnorhynchus Fairchild, 1980
Tabanus gyruchus Burton, 1978

H-J

Tabanus haemagogus Williston, 1901
Tabanus haimovitchae Surcouf, 1909
Tabanus hainanensis Stone, 1972
Tabanus haitiensis Kröber, 1931
Tabanus hakkariensis (Schacht, 1983)
Tabanus hamoni Ovazza & Valade, 1958
Tabanus hashemii Ježek, 1981
Tabanus hauseri Olsufiev, 1967
Tabanus haysi Philip, 1956
Tabanus hedlundi Kapoor, Grewal & Sharma, 1991
Tabanus hellenicus Peus, 1980
Tabanus helvinus Burton, 1978
Tabanus herbertensis Mackerras, 1964
Tabanus herculeanus (Enderlein, 1925)
Tabanus hipparionis Cockerell, 1909
Tabanus hirsutus (Thunberg, 1827)
Tabanus hirsutus Villers, 1789
Tabanus hirtipalpis Ricardo, 1911
Tabanus hirtistriatus Ricardo, 1911
Tabanus hirtitibia Walker, 1850
Tabanus hisarensis Veer, Parashar & Rao, 1999
Tabanus hispanicus Peus, 1980
Tabanus hispanus Peus, 1980
Tabanus hissaricus Baratov, 1962
Tabanus holtzianus (Enderlein, 1927)
Tabanus honestus Walker, 1850
Tabanus hongchowensis Liu, 1962
Tabanus hongkongiensis Ricardo, 1916
Tabanus hoogstraali Philip, 1959
Tabanus howdeni (Philip, 1978)
Tabanus huallagensis Fairchild, 1976
Tabanus huangshanensis Xu & Wu, 1985
Tabanus humboldti Fairchild, 1985
Tabanus humilis Coquillett, 1898
Tabanus humillimus Walker, 1857
Tabanus humiloides Xu, 1980
Tabanus hybridus Wiedemann, 1828
Tabanus hypomacros Surcouf, 1922
Tabanus hyugaensis Hayakawa, 1977
Tabanus ianthinus Surcouf, 1907
Tabanus iber Peus, 1980
Tabanus ichiokai Ôuchi, 1943
Tabanus ictericus Surcouf, 1922
Tabanus idulis Burton, 1978
Tabanus ignobilis Rondani, 1875
Tabanus ilchanii Ježek, 1981
Tabanus ilharcoi Dias, 1991
Tabanus illustris Ricardo, 1913
Tabanus imitans Walker, 1848
Tabanus imitator Lutz, 1909
Tabanus immanis Wiedemann, 1828
Tabanus immixtus Walker, 1859
Tabanus imparicallosus Schuurmans Stekhoven, 1926
Tabanus impertinens Oldroyd, 1954
Tabanus importunus Wiedemann, 1828
Tabanus impurus Karsch, 1888
Tabanus inaensis Asakawa & Takahasi, 1975
Tabanus inaequannulatus Schuurmans Stekhoven, 1932
Tabanus incohaerens Mackerras, 1972
Tabanus inconspicuus (Walker, 1848)
Tabanus incultus Wulp, 1881
Tabanus indecisus (Bigot, 1892)
Tabanus indianus Ricardo, 1911
Tabanus indicus Fabricius, 1805
Tabanus indifferens Szilády, 1926
Tabanus indiscriminatus Ricardo, 1915
Tabanus indistinctus Bigot, 1892
Tabanus indosinensis Toumanoff, 1950
Tabanus indrae Hauser, 1939
Tabanus infans Walker, 1850
Tabanus infestus Bogatchev & Samedov, 1949
Tabanus inflatipalpis Schuurmans Stekhoven, 1926
Tabanus ingens Schuurmans Stekhoven, 1926
Tabanus inifromis Ricardo, 1911
Tabanus innotabilis Walker, 1848
Tabanus inobservatus Ricardo, 1911
Tabanus insidiator Austen, 1922
Tabanus insignis Loew, 1858
Tabanus invalidus Szilády, 1926
Tabanus isis Fairchild, 1976
Tabanus itaituba Fairchild, 1985
Tabanus ixion Osten Sacken, 1882
Tabanus iyoensis Shiraki, 1918
Tabanus jacobi Coher, 1963
Tabanus jadini Fain, 1949
Tabanus javanus Fabricius, 1805
Tabanus jeanae Burton, 1978
Tabanus jigongshanensis Xu, 1983
Tabanus jigongshanoides Xu & Huang, 1990
Tabanus jigonshanensis Xu, 1982
Tabanus jilamensis Hine, 1925
Tabanus jinghongensis Yang, Xu & Chen, 1999
Tabanus jinhuai Xu & Sun, 2007
Tabanus johannesi Fairchild, 1942
Tabanus johnburgeri Xu & Xu, 1993
Tabanus johnsoni Hine, 1907
Tabanus joidus (Bigot, 1892)
Tabanus joshii Coher, 1985
Tabanus jucundus Walker, 1848
Tabanus justorius Rondani, 1875

K-L

Tabanus kabuensis Yao, 1984
Tabanus kaburagii Murdoch & Takahasi, 1969
Tabanus kakhyenensis Senior-White, 1922
Tabanus kamengensis Datta & Das, 1978
Tabanus karaosus Timmer, 1984
Tabanus karenkoensis Shiraki, 1932
Tabanus katoi Kono & Takahasi, 1940
Tabanus kermani Abbassian-Lintzen, 1961
Tabanus kesseli Philip, 1950
Tabanus khalafi Leclercq, 1986
Tabanus khasiensis Ricardo, 1909
Tabanus kiangsuensis Kröber, 1933
Tabanus kingi Austen, 1911
Tabanus kinoshitai Kono & Takahasi, 1939
Tabanus kisliuki Stone, 1940
Tabanus konis Philip, 1960
Tabanus kotoshoensis Shiraki, 1918
Tabanus krombeini Burger, 1982
Tabanus kumaonensis Kapoor, Grewal & Sharma, 1991
Tabanus kumatai Matsumura & Takahasi, 1976
Tabanus kumrakomensis Kapoor, Grewal & Sharma, 1991
Tabanus kunmingensis Wang, 1985
Tabanus kwangsinensis Wang & Liu, 1977
Tabanus kwatta Fairchild, 1983
Tabanus kwiluensis Oldroyd, 1954
Tabanus lacajaensis Kröber, 1931
Tabanus lacustris Stone, 1935
Tabanus laetetinctus Becker, 1913
Tabanus laevigatus Szilády, 1926
Tabanus lamiensis Burger, 1991
Tabanus laotianus (Bigot, 1890)
Tabanus larvatus Burton, 1978
Tabanus lateralbus Schuurmans Stekhoven, 1932
Tabanus laticornis (Schuurmans Stekhoven, 1926)
Tabanus laticornis Hine, 1904
Tabanus latifascies Schuurmans Stekhoven, 1926
Tabanus lavandoni Kröber, 1939
Tabanus laverani Surcouf, 1907
Tabanus leclercqi Abbassian-Lintzen, 1961
Tabanus leleani Austen, 1920
Tabanus lenticulatus Oldroyd, 1949
Tabanus lenticuloides Mackerras, 1972
Tabanus lentis Stone, 1972
Tabanus lentisignatus Schuurmans Stekhoven, 1926
Tabanus leucocnematus (Bigot, 1892)
Tabanus leucohirtus Ricardo, 1909
Tabanus leucomelas Walker, 1848
Tabanus leucopogon (Bigot, 1892)
Tabanus leucostomus Loew, 1858
Tabanus levantinus Peus, 1980
Tabanus leveri Mackerras & Rageau, 1958
Tabanus lewisi Philip, 1957
Tabanus liangshanensis Xu, 1979
Tabanus lijiangensis Yang & Xu, 1993
Tabanus limbatinevris Macquart, 1847
Tabanus limbithorax (Macquart, 1855)
Tabanus limushanensis Xu, 1979
Tabanus lineataenia Xu, 1979
Tabanus lineifrons Lutz, 1912
Tabanus lineola var. hinellus Philip, 1960
Tabanus lingfengi Xu, Zhan & Sun, 2006
Tabanus lintzeni Zeegers & Müller, 2014
Tabanus liventipes Surcouf, 1907
Tabanus loczyi Szilády, 1926
Tabanus longibasalis Schuurmans Stekhoven, 1926
Tabanus longinquus Oldroyd, 1954
Tabanus longistylus Xu, Ni & Xu, 1984
Tabanus longiusculus Hine, 1907
Tabanus longus Osten Sacken, 1876
Tabanus loukashkini Philip, 1956
Tabanus lubutuensis Bequaert, 1930
Tabanus lucidulus Walker, 1848
Tabanus lucifer Szilády, 1926
Tabanus lufirensis Bequaert, 1913
Tabanus luizae Dias, 1979
Tabanus lunatus Fabricius, 1794
Tabanus lushanensis Liu, 1962
Tabanus lutzi Kröber, 1934
Tabanus luzonensis Philip, 1959
Tabanus lyneborgi Mackerras, 1972

M

Tabanus macdonaldi Philip, 1960
Tabanus macer (Bigot, 1892)
Tabanus macfarlanei Ricardo, 1916
Tabanus machadoi Dias, 1964
Tabanus macilentus Coher, 1985
Tabanus macquarti Schiner, 1868
Tabanus maculicornis Zetterstedt, 1842
Tabanus maculinevris Macquart, 1855
Tabanus maculipennis Wiedemann, 1828
Tabanus maculosus Coquillett, 1902
Tabanus madoerensis Schuurmans Stekhoven, 1926
Tabanus maedai Hayakawa, 1976
Tabanus maini Mackerras, 1971
Tabanus maiombensis Dias, 1973
Tabanus makimurae Ôuchi, 1943
Tabanus malayensis Ricardo, 1911
Tabanus maliensis Goodwin, 1982
Tabanus mandarinus Schiner, 1868
Tabanus manipurensis Ricardo, 1913
Tabanus marginalis Fabricius, 1805
Tabanus marginatus Macquart, 1848
Tabanus marginenevris Macquart, 1855
Tabanus marianii (Leclercq, 1956)
Tabanus marmorosus Surcouf, 1909
Tabanus martini Surcouf, 1907
Tabanus martinii Kröber, 1928
Tabanus masamitsui Hayakawa, 1976
Tabanus mateusi Dias, 1979
Tabanus matosi Dias, 1966
Tabanus matsumotoensis Murdoch & Takahasi, 1961
Tabanus matsuzawai Hayakawa & Takahasi, 1983
Tabanus matutinimordicus Xu, 1989
Tabanus maurus Philip, 1974
Tabanus mazzottii Philip, 1954
Tabanus mediatrimaculatus Schuurmans Stekhoven, 1932
Tabanus medionotatus Austen, 1912
Tabanus meghalayensis Datta & Biswas, 1977
Tabanus meihuashanensis Xu & Xu, 1992
Tabanus melanocerus Wiedemann, 1828
Tabanus melanogaster Brèthes, 1910
Tabanus melanognathus (Bigot, 1890)
Tabanus mendossai Dias, 1992
Tabanus mengdingensis Xu, Xu & Sun, 2008
Tabanus mengdingensis Xu, Xu & Sun, 2008
Tabanus menoensis Taylor & Chainey, 1994
Tabanus mentitus Walker, 1848
Tabanus meraukensis Mackerras, 1964
Tabanus meridionalis Thunberg, 1827
Tabanus merychippi Cockerell, 1916
Tabanus mesnili Surcouf, 1909
Tabanus mesogaeus Burton, 1978
Tabanus mesquitelai Dias, 1991
Tabanus mianjangalensis Ježek, 1981
Tabanus miki Brauer, 1880
Tabanus miles Wiedemann, 1828
Tabanus mindanensis Philip, 1959
Tabanus miniatus Datta & Biswas, 1977
Tabanus minimus Wulp, 1881
Tabanus minuscularius Austen, 1912
Tabanus minusculus Datta & Das, 1978
Tabanus mishanensis Xu & Liu, 1982
Tabanus mistshenkoi Olsufiev, 1937
Tabanus mitidjensis Macquart, 1839
Tabanus miyajima Ricardo, 1911
Tabanus miyakei Shiraki, 1918
Tabanus moderator Stone, 1938
Tabanus modestus (Kröber, 1931)
Tabanus moerens Fabricius, 1787
Tabanus mofidii Leclercq, 1960
Tabanus mogollon Burger, 1974
Tabanus molestus Say, 1823
Tabanus monchai Leclercq, 1962
Tabanus mongolensis Kröber, 1933
Tabanus monocallosus Dias, 1955
Tabanus monoculus Doleschall, 1858
Tabanus monoensis Hine, 1924
Tabanus monokini Philip, 1966
Tabanus monomiensis Takahasi, 1950
Tabanus monops Bequaert, 1940
Tabanus monotaeniatus (Bigot, 1892)
Tabanus monotaxis Philip, 1967
Tabanus montiasiaticus Olsufiev, 1977
Tabanus morbosus Stone, 1938
Tabanus mordax Austen, 1911
Tabanus moreli Ovazza, 1962
Tabanus morio Linnaeus, 1767
Tabanus morsitans Ricardo, 1908
Tabanus mossambicensis Dias, 1985
Tabanus motuoensis Yao & Liu, 1983
Tabanus mucronatus Fairchild, 1961
Tabanus mularis Stone, 1935
Tabanus multicinctus Schuurmans Stekhoven, 1926
Tabanus murdochi Philip, 1961
Tabanus muruensis Mackerras, 1964
Tabanus muscoides Toumanoff, 1950
Tabanus mutatus Wang & Liu, 1990

N

Tabanus namdaphaicus Datta & Chakraborti, 1985
Tabanus namibiensis Dias, 1989
Tabanus nanpingensis Xu, Xu & Sun, 2008
Tabanus nantae Toumanoff, 1950
Tabanus napaensis Nieschulz, 1927
Tabanus nartshukae Olsufiev, 1972
Tabanus neavei Austen, 1912
Tabanus nebulosus De Geer, 1776
Tabanus nefarius Hine, 1907
Tabanus nefas Usher, 1971
Tabanus neglectus Kröber, 1931
Tabanus negritos Philip, 1959
Tabanus nematocallus Fairchild, 1985
Tabanus nemocallosus Ricardo, 1909
Tabanus nemoralis Meigen, 1820
Tabanus neoindianus Philip, 1959
Tabanus neovestitus Kröber, 1931
Tabanus nepalensis Coher, 1971
Tabanus nephodes (Bigot, 1892)
Tabanus nereus Fairchild, 1943
Tabanus nexus Walker, 1856
Tabanus nicobarensis Schiner, 1868
Tabanus nigeriensis Crosskey, 1959
Tabanus nigrabdominis Wang, 1982
Tabanus nigrefronti Liu, 1981
Tabanus nigrescens Palisot de Beauvois, 1809
Tabanus nigrhinus Philip, 1962
Tabanus nigricaudus Xu, 1981
Tabanus nigrifascies (Bigot, 1892)
Tabanus nigrifeminibus Austen, 1912
Tabanus nigrifer Walker, 1871
Tabanus nigrihinus Philip, 1962
Tabanus nigrimaculatus Xu, 1981
Tabanus nigrimanus Walker, 1848
Tabanus nigrimordicus Xu, 1979
Tabanus nigripes Wiedemann, 1821
Tabanus nigriventris Macquart, 1846
Tabanus nigrofemoratus Kröber, 1929
Tabanus nigrostriatus Ricardo, 1908
Tabanus nigrotectus (Bigot, 1890)
Tabanus nigrovittatus Macquart, 1847
Tabanus nilakinus Philip, 1960
Tabanus nipponicus Murdoch & Takahasi, 1969
Tabanus niveinotatus Bequaert, 1930
Tabanus noctuinus Schuurmans Stekhoven, 1926
Tabanus nondescriptus Fairchild, 1973
Tabanus notatus Ricardo, 1915
Tabanus novaescotiae Macquart, 1847
Tabanus nyasae Ricardo, 1900
Tabanus nyctops Burton, 1978

O

Tabanus obconicus Walker, 1850
Tabanus obesus (Bigot, 1892)
Tabanus obliquemaculatus Macquart, 1838
Tabanus obscuratus Walker, 1864
Tabanus obscurefumatus Surcouf, 1906
Tabanus obscurehirtus Ricardo, 1908
Tabanus obscurestigmatus Bigot, 1859
Tabanus obscurestriatus Ricardo, 1908
Tabanus obscurilineatus Taylor, 1919
Tabanus obscurior Ricardo, 1908
Tabanus obscurus Xu, 1983
Tabanus obsolescens Pandellé, 1883
Tabanus obsoletimaculus Xu, 1983
Tabanus obsoletus Wiedemann, 1821
Tabanus obtusipalpis Schuurmans Stekhoven, 1926
Tabanus obumbratus Bequaert, 1940
Tabanus occidentalis Linnaeus, 1758
Tabanus occidentalis Oldroyd, 1954
Tabanus ochroater Schuurmans Stekhoven, 1926
Tabanus ochroceras Schuurmans Stekhoven, 1932
Tabanus ochrogaster Schuurmans Stekhoven, 1932
Tabanus ochros Schuurmans Stekhoven, 1926
Tabanus octulus Walker, 1848
Tabanus okinawanoides Xu, 1989
Tabanus okinawanus Shiraki, 1918
Tabanus oknos Surcouf, 1922
Tabanus oldroydi Philip, 1941
Tabanus olivaceiventris Macquart, 1847
Tabanus oliviventris Xu, 1979
Tabanus oliviventroides Xu, 1984
Tabanus olsufjevi Hauser, 1960
Tabanus olympius Peus, 1980
Tabanus omeishanensis Xu, 1979
Tabanus omnirobustus Wang, 1988
Tabanus onoi Murdoch & Takahasi, 1969
Tabanus opalescens Schuurmans Stekhoven, 1926
Tabanus oppugnator Austen, 1925
Tabanus optatus Walker, 1856
Tabanus orbicallus Philip, 1936
Tabanus orbis Burton, 1978
Tabanus oreophilus Xu & Liao, 1985
Tabanus orientalis Wiedemann, 1824
Tabanus orientis Walker, 1848
Tabanus orphnos Wang, 1982
Tabanus otsurui Ogawa, 1960
Tabanus ovazzai Crosskey, 1959
Tabanus oviventris Schuurmans Stekhoven, 1926
Tabanus oxybeles Burton, 1978
Tabanus oxyceratus (Bigot, 1892)

P

Tabanus pachypalpus (Bigot, 1892)
Tabanus paganus Chen, 1984
Tabanus palauensis Takahashi, 1944
Tabanus palawanensis Philip, 1959
Tabanus pallidepectoratus (Bigot, 1892)
Tabanus pallidifacies Surcouf, 1906
Tabanus pallidipes Austen, 1920
Tabanus pallidiscutum Philip, 1959
Tabanus pallidiventer Schuurmans Stekhoven, 1926
Tabanus pallipennis Macquart, 1846
Tabanus palpalis Brèthes, 1910
Tabanus palpinus Palisot de Beauvois, 1819
Tabanus papuensis Oldroyd, 1964
Tabanus par Walker, 1854
Tabanus parabactrianus Liu, 1960
Tabanus parabrunneus Schuurmans Stekhoven, 1932
Tabanus parabuddha Xu, 1983
Tabanus parachinensis Xu, Zhan & Sun, 2006
Tabanus parachrysater Yao, 1984
Tabanus paradiversifrons Xu & Guo, 2005
Tabanus paradiversifrons Xu, 2005
Tabanus paradoxus Jaennicke, 1866
Tabanus parafuscomaculatus Schuurmans Stekhoven, 1932
Tabanus parahippi Cockerell, 1909
Tabanus parahybridus Schuurmans Stekhoven, 1932
Tabanus paraichiokai Xu, Xu & Sun, 2008
Tabanus parallelifrons Schuurmans Stekhoven, 1926
Tabanus paralleliventer Schuurmans Stekhoven, 1926
Tabanus pararubidus Yao & Liu, 2008
Tabanus pararufiventris Nieschulz, 1927
Tabanus parasexcinctus Xu & Sun, 2008
Tabanus parawuyishanensis Xu & Sun, 2007
Tabanus parimmixtus Schuurmans Stekhoven, 1932
Tabanus particaecus Hardy, 1948
Tabanus particolor Szilády, 1926
Tabanus parvicallosus Ricardo, 1914
Tabanus parvidentatus Macquart, 1838
Tabanus parviformus Wang, 1985
Tabanus passosi Dias, 1974
Tabanus patriarchus Oldroyd, 1949
Tabanus pauper Rondani, 1875
Tabanus paviei Burton, 1978
Tabanus pazukii Ježek, 1990
Tabanus pellucidus Fabricius, 1805
Tabanus pellus Philip, 1959
Tabanus penai Philip, 1967
Tabanus pendleburyi Philip, 1960
Tabanus pengquensis Zhu & Xu, 1995
Tabanus perakiensis Ricardo, 1911
Tabanus perelegans Olsufiev, 1972
Tabanus perileucus Philip, 1974
Tabanus persimilis Dolin & Andreeva, 1986
Tabanus pertinens Austen, 1912
Tabanus peruvianus Macquart, 1848
Tabanus petiolatus Hine, 1917
Tabanus petiscai Dias, 1974
Tabanus philippinensis Kröber, 1924
Tabanus piceiventris Rondani, 1848
Tabanus picicalosus Fairchild, 1951
Tabanus pictiventris Szilády, 1926
Tabanus pingxiangensis Xu & Liao, 1985
Tabanus platensis Brèthes, 1910
Tabanus platycerus Fairchild, 1976
Tabanus pleskei Kröber, 1925
Tabanus pluto Walker, 1848
Tabanus pollinosus Ricardo, 1913
Tabanus polygonus Walker, 1854
Tabanus polyphemus Fairchild, 1958
Tabanus portschinskii Olsufiev, 1937
Tabanus postactus Oldroyd, 1947
Tabanus praematurus Austen, 1922
Tabanus praepilatus Fairchild, 1943
Tabanus praepositus Walker, 1848
Tabanus praeteritus Fairchild, 1947
Tabanus pratti Ricardo, 1911
Tabanus prefulventer Wang, 1985
Tabanus primitivus Walker, 1848
Tabanus principis Bequaert, 1930
Tabanus priscoides Schuurmans Stekhoven, 1926
Tabanus pristinus Burton, 1978
Tabanus procallosus Lutz, 1912
Tabanus provincialis Ricardo, 1913
Tabanus proximus Walker, 1848
Tabanus pruinosus Bigot, 1892
Tabanus prunicolor Lutz, 1912
Tabanus pseudoculus Fairchild, 1942
Tabanus pseudogratus Goodwin, 1982
Tabanus pseudoliviventris Chen & Xu, 1992
Tabanus pseudolunatus Dias, 1979
Tabanus pseudolunatus Dias, 1980
Tabanus pseudonebulosus Gorayeb, 2006
Tabanus pseudothoracinus Dias, 1996
Tabanus ptolemaeanus Szilády, 1923
Tabanus pullulus Austen, 1912
Tabanus pullus Philippi, 1865
Tabanus pulvifer Walker, 1854
Tabanus pumilus Macquart, 1838
Tabanus punctifer Osten Sacken, 1876
Tabanus punctipleura Hine, 1920
Tabanus puncturius Xu & Liao, 1985
Tabanus pungens Wiedemann, 1828
Tabanus pusillus Macquart, 1838
Tabanus puteus Ricardo, 1911

Q-R

Tabanus qinlingensis Wang, 1985
Tabanus quadrifocus Burton, 1978
Tabanus quadriguttatus Ricardo, 1908
Tabanus quadrisignatus Ricardo, 1908
Tabanus quadritriangularis Schuurmans Stekhoven, 1932
Tabanus quaesitus Stone, 1938
Tabanus quatei Philip, 1962
Tabanus quatuornotatus Meigen, 1820
Tabanus queenslandii Ricardo, 1914
Tabanus quinarius Wang & Liu, 1990
Tabanus quinquecinctus Ricardo, 1914
Tabanus quinquepunctatus Hine, 1925
Tabanus quinquetriangularis Schuurmans Stekhoven, 1932
Tabanus quinquevittatus Wiedemann, 1821
Tabanus rageaui Oldroyd, 1954
Tabanus rallus Philip, 1978
Tabanus rectilineatus Schuurmans Stekhoven, 1926
Tabanus rectus Loew, 1858
Tabanus recusans Walker, 1858
Tabanus reducens Walker, 1859
Tabanus regularis Jaennicke, 1866
Tabanus reinwardtii Wiedemann, 1828
Tabanus remotus Walker, 1848
Tabanus restrepoensis Fairchild, 1942
Tabanus rhinargus Philip, 1962
Tabanus rhizonshine Philip, 1954
Tabanus rhizophorae Fairchild, 1943
Tabanus ricardae Surcouf, 1906
Tabanus rixator Fairchild, 1943
Tabanus riyadhae Amoudi & Leclercq, 1988
Tabanus rockefelleri Philip, 1954
Tabanus rondoniensis Henriques, Krolow, Zamarchi & Camargo, 2022
Tabanus rosarioi Dias, 1994
Tabanus rosselensis Mackerras, 1964
Tabanus rossi Philip, 1959
Tabanus rothschildi Surcouf, 1906
Tabanus roubaudi Toumanoff, 1950
Tabanus rousselii Macquart, 1839
Tabanus rubicundulus Austen, 1922
Tabanus rubicundus Macquart, 1846
Tabanus rubidaceus Dias, 1975
Tabanus rubidoides Szilády, 1926
Tabanus rubidus Wiedemann, 1821
Tabanus rubiginosus Walker, 1850
Tabanus rubioi Dias, 1987
Tabanus rubricauda Philip, 1958
Tabanus rubripes Macquart, 1838
Tabanus rubriscutatus Schuurmans Stekhoven, 1926
Tabanus rubriventris Macquart, 1838
Tabanus ruficoloratus Philip, 1960
Tabanus rufidens Bigot, 1887
Tabanus rufimedius Szilády, 1926
Tabanus rufioloratus Philip, 1960
Tabanus rufipes Palisot de Beauvois, 1806
Tabanus rufiscutellatus Schuurmans Stekhoven, 1926
Tabanus rufiventris Fabricius, 1805
Tabanus rufofrater Walker, 1850
Tabanus ruoqiangensis Xiang & Xu, 1986
Tabanus rupinae Austen, 1920
Tabanus rupium (Brauer, 1880)
Tabanus russatoides Xu & Deng, 1990
Tabanus russatus Wang, 1982
Tabanus rusticatus Burton, 1978
Tabanus ryukyuensis Murdoch & Takahasi, 1961

S

Tabanus sabuletoroides Xu, 1979
Tabanus sabuletorum Loew, 1874
Tabanus sackeni Fairchild, 1934
Tabanus safavii Ježek, 1981
Tabanus sagax Osten Sacken, 1876
Tabanus sagittipalpis Szilády, 1926
Tabanus samarensis Philip, 1959
Tabanus samawangensis Burger, 1988
Tabanus samoensis Ferguson, 1927
Tabanus sandersoni Austen, 1912
Tabanus sannio Fairchild, 1956
Tabanus sanyaensis Xu, Xu & Sun, 2008
Tabanus sapporoensis Shiraki, 1918
Tabanus sapporoenus Shiraki, 1918
Tabanus sarbazensis Ježek, 1990
Tabanus sarmentoi Dias, 1959
Tabanus sasai Watanabe & Takahasi, 1971
Tabanus sauteri Ricardo, 1913
Tabanus saxicolus Usher, 1965
Tabanus sayensis Xu, Xu & Sun, 2008
Tabanus schadei Fairchild, 1976
Tabanus schiva Moucha & Chvála, 1959
Tabanus scholae Oldroyd, 1954
Tabanus scutellus Philip, 1970
Tabanus searsi Philip, 1978
Tabanus secedens Walker, 1854
Tabanus secundus Walker, 1848
Tabanus selene Schuurmans Stekhoven, 1926
Tabanus selousi Austen, 1912
Tabanus selvaticus Burger, Bermúdez & Bermúdez, 1987
Tabanus semenovi Olsufiev, 1937
Tabanus semiargenteus Olsufiev, 1937
Tabanus semicircularis Ricardo, 1913
Tabanus semirufus Szilády, 1926
Tabanus separatus Efflatoun, 1930
Tabanus sepiensis Philip, 1954
Tabanus sepikensis Oldroyd, 1964
Tabanus sequens Walker, 1848
Tabanus sequens Walker, 1850
Tabanus sericiventris Loew, 1858
Tabanus serpentina Wiedemann, 1828
Tabanus serus Walker, 1861
Tabanus servillei Macquart, 1838
Tabanus sexcinctus Ricardo, 1911
Tabanus sextriangulus Gorayeb & Rafael, 1984
Tabanus shaanxiensis Xu, Lu & Wu, 1990
Tabanus shannonellus Kröber, 1936
Tabanus shantungensis Ôuchi, 1943
Tabanus shelkovnikovi Paramonov, 1934
Tabanus shennongjianensis Xu, Ni & Xu, 1984
Tabanus shikokuensis Murdoch & Takahasi, 1961
Tabanus shyamarupi Datta & Chakraborti, 1985
Tabanus siamensis Ricardo, 1911
Tabanus siassensis Mackerras, 1964
Tabanus siccus Walker, 1850
Tabanus sidneyensis Macquart, 1846
Tabanus siebersi Schuurmans Stekhoven, 1928
Tabanus sierensis Burger, Bermúdez & Bermúdez, 1987
Tabanus sierrensis Burger, Bermúdez & Bermúdez, 1987
Tabanus signatipennis Portschinsky, 1887
Tabanus signifer Walker, 1856
Tabanus significans Ricardo, 1911
Tabanus significans var. inaequisignatus Schuurmans Stekhoven, 1932
Tabanus silvanus Ricardo, 1908
Tabanus similis Macquart, 1850
Tabanus simplicissimus Walker, 1856
Tabanus simpsoni Austen, 1912
Tabanus sinewitensis Mackerras, 1972
Tabanus sinicus Walker, 1848
Tabanus skarduensis Abro, 1992
Tabanus soembawensis Schuurmans Stekhoven, 1926
Tabanus sorbillans Wiedemann, 1828
Tabanus soubiroui Surcouf, 1922
Tabanus sowi Goodwin, 1982
Tabanus sparus Whitney, 1879
Tabanus speciosus Ricardo, 1911
Tabanus spectabilis Loew, 1858
Tabanus speculum Walker, 1861
Tabanus sphinx Philip, 1960
Tabanus spodopteroides Olsufiev, Moucha & Chvála, 1969
Tabanus spodopterus Wiedemann, 1820
Tabanus stabilis Wang, 1982
Tabanus stackelbergiellus Olsufiev, 1967
Tabanus sticticolis Surcouf, 1906
Tabanus stonei Philip, 1941
Tabanus strangmannii Ricardo, 1914
Tabanus striatus Fabricius, 1787
Tabanus strigimaculus Fairchild, 1942
Tabanus strix Szilády, 1923
Tabanus stueberi Oldroyd, 1949
Tabanus stygius Say, 1823
Tabanus subbasalis Kapoor, Grewal & Sharma, 1991
Tabanus subcaeruleus Peus, 1980
Tabanus subcamipus Philip, 1960
Tabanus subcanipus Philip, 1960
Tabanus subcinerascens Ricardo, 1911
Tabanus subcinerescens Mackerras, 1971
Tabanus subcinnamoneus Mackerras, 1972
Tabanus subcohaerens Mackerras, 1964
Tabanus subcordiger Liu, 1960
Tabanus subcrassus Kapoor, Grewal & Sharma, 1991
Tabanus subfemoralis Philip, 1978
Tabanus subflavicornis Philip, 1970
Tabanus subfurvicaudus Wu & Xu, 1992
Tabanus subhybridus Philip, 1960
Tabanus subimmanis Philip, 1959
Tabanus subjoidus Philip, 1959
Tabanus sublongus Stone, 1938
Tabanus submacilentus Coher, 1985
Tabanus submalayensis Wang & Liu, 1977
Tabanus subniger Coquillett, 1906
Tabanus suboliviventris Xu, 1984
Tabanus subpulliomaculatus Xu & Zhang, 1990
Tabanus subpullomaculatus Xu & Zhang, 1990
Tabanus subrecusans Mackerras, 1964
Tabanus subruber Bellardi, 1859
Tabanus subrubidus Chvála & Lyneborg, 1970
Tabanus subrussatus Wang, 1982
Tabanus subsabuletorum Olsufiev, 1936
Tabanus subsimilis Bellardi, 1859
Tabanus subsinerascens Ricardo, 1911
Tabanus subviolaceus Fairchild, 1961
Tabanus succurvus Walker, 1859
Tabanus sudeticus Zeller, 1842
Tabanus sufis Jaennicke, 1867
Tabanus sugens Wiedemann, 1828
Tabanus sulfurescens Schuurmans Stekhoven, 1932
Tabanus sumatrensis Macquart, 1834
Tabanus superjumentarius Whitney, 1879
Tabanus surifer Fairchild, 1964
Tabanus swiridowi Portschinsky, 1881
Tabanus symmetrus Burton, 1978
Tabanus syriacus Kröber, 1925
Tabanus systenus Burton, 1978
Tabanus szechenyianus Szilády, 1926
Tabanus sziladyi Schuurmans Stekhoven, 1932

T

Tabanus taeniatus Macquart, 1834
Tabanus taeniellus Philip, 1960
Tabanus taeniola Palisot de Beauvois, 1806
Tabanus taiensis Taylor & Chainey, 1994
Tabanus taipingensis Xu & Wu, 1985
Tabanus taiwanus Hayakawa & Takahasi, 1983
Tabanus talyshi Olsufiev, 1972
Tabanus tambaensis Murdoch & Takahasi, 1969
Tabanus tamthaiorum Burton, 1978
Tabanus tangi Xu & Xu, 1992
Tabanus tardinotus Bequaert, 1940
Tabanus taygetus Peus, 1980
Tabanus teishengi Xu & Sun, 2007
Tabanus tenasserimi Szilády, 1926
Tabanus tendeiroi Dias, 1980
Tabanus tenebrosus Walker, 1854
Tabanus tenens Walker, 1850
Tabanus tenuifrons Datta & Chakraborti, 1985
Tabanus tenuipalpis Austen, 1912
Tabanus tenuis Schuurmans Stekhoven, 1932
Tabanus tenuistria Kröber, 1931
Tabanus tephrodes Philippi, 1865
Tabanus teraiensis Coher, 1971
Tabanus tergestinus Egger, 1859
Tabanus terterjani Andreeva & Dolin, 1982
Tabanus testaceiventris Macquart, 1847
Tabanus tetropsis Bigot, 1892
Tabanus texanus Hine, 1907
Tabanus thellus Burger, 1982
Tabanus thermarum Burton, 1978
Tabanus thiemeana (Enderlein, 1925)
Tabanus thoracinus Palisot de Beauvois, 1806
Tabanus thurmani Philip, 1960
Tabanus tianyui Xu & Sun, 2008
Tabanus tienmuensis Liu, 1962
Tabanus tiluensis Nieschulz, 1927
Tabanus tinctothorax Ricardo, 1911
Tabanus tinctus Walker, 1850
Tabanus titoi Dias, 1962
Tabanus tokaraensis Hayakawa & Suzuki, 1984
Tabanus tokunoshimaensis Hayakawa & Suzuki, 1984
Tabanus tonglai Surcouf, 1922
Tabanus toshiokai Murdoch & Takahasi, 1969
Tabanus toumanoffi Philip, 1960
Tabanus townsendi Johnson, 1919
Tabanus townsvilli Ricardo, 1915
Tabanus traubi Philip, 1960
Tabanus trianguliger Austen, 1912
Tabanus triangulum Wiedemann, 1828
Tabanus tricoloratus Schuurmans Stekhoven, 1926
Tabanus tricolorus Xu, 1981
Tabanus trigonus Coquillett, 1898
Tabanus trijunctus Walker, 1854
Tabanus trilineatus Latreille, 1817
Tabanus tripurensis Datta, 1986
Tabanus triquetrornatus Carter, 1915
Tabanus tristichus Fairchild, 1976
Tabanus tristis Wulp, 1881
Tabanus trivittatus Fabricius, 1805
Tabanus tuberculatus Ricardo, 1911
Tabanus tumidicallus Burger, 1982
Tabanus tumiscapens Philip, 1954
Tabanus turbidus Wiedemann, 1828

U-V

Tabanus umbripennis Ricardo, 1915
Tabanus undulans Schuurmans Stekhoven, 1926
Tabanus unicinctus Loew, 1856
Tabanus unicus Burton, 1978
Tabanus unifasciatus Loew, 1858
Tabanus unifasciens Philip, 1959
Tabanus uniformis Ricardo, 1911
Tabanus unilineatus Loew, 1852
Tabanus unipunctatus (Bigot, 1892)
Tabanus unistriatus Hine, 1906
Tabanus univentris Walker, 1848
Tabanus ustus Walker, 1850
Tabanus vanleeuweni Oldroyd, 1949
Tabanus varelai Dias, 1980
Tabanus variabilis Loew, 1858
Tabanus varipes Walker, 1836
Tabanus variventris Macquart, 1847
Tabanus vaseyi Sherman, 1991
Tabanus vectensis (Cockerell, 1921)
Tabanus velutinus Surcouf, 1906
Tabanus ventriflavimarginatus Schuurmans Stekhoven, 1926
Tabanus venustus Osten Sacken, 1876
Tabanus vernus Burton, 1978
Tabanus vestitus Wiedemann, 1819
Tabanus veterinarius Dias, 1964
Tabanus vibex Suh, Choi & Kwon, 2002
Tabanus violaceus Schuurmans Stekhoven, 1926
Tabanus virgulatus Austen, 1922
Tabanus vittiger Thomson, 1869
Tabanus vivax Osten Sacken, 1876
Tabanus vix Philip, 1960

W-Z

Tabanus wallacei Szilády, 1926
Tabanus weiheensis Xu & Liu, 1980
Tabanus weiningensis Xu, Xu & Sun, 2008
Tabanus wellmanii Austen, 1908
Tabanus wenzeli Philip, 1959
Tabanus weyrauchi Barretto, 1949
Tabanus wiedemanni Osten Sacken, 1876
Tabanus williamsii Austen, 1908
Tabanus wilpattuensis Burger, 1982
Tabanus wilsoni Pechuman, 1962
Tabanus wokei Fairchild, 1983
Tabanus woollastoni Ricardo, 1913
Tabanus wuyishanensis Xu & Xu, 1995
Tabanus wuzhishanensis Xu, 1979
Tabanus wyndhamensis Mackerras, 1971
Tabanus xanthocorus Burton, 1978
Tabanus xanthogaster Philippi, 1865
Tabanus xanthoimus Philip, 1960
Tabanus xanthomelas Austen, 1912
Tabanus xanthos Wang, 1982
Tabanus xanti Szilády, 1926
Tabanus xenorhynchus Fairchild, 1947
Tabanus xerodes Philip, 1967
Tabanus xuezhongi Xu & Guo, 2005
Tabanus xuthopogon Fairchild, 1985
Tabanus xuthus Philip, 1960
Tabanus yablonicus Takagi, 1941
Tabanus yadongensis Xu & Sun, 2007
Tabanus yaeyamaensis Hayakawa & Hasegawa, 1981
Tabanus yakuensis Ôuchi, 1943
Tabanus yanbaruensis Hayakawa & Yoneyama, 1983
Tabanus yao Macquart, 1855
Tabanus yasujensis Ježek, 1981
Tabanus yishanensis Xu, 1979
Tabanus yoneyamai Hayakawa, 1984
Tabanus yoshimotoi Burger, 1991
Tabanus yucatanus Townsend, 1897
Tabanus yulensis Röder, 1892
Tabanus yunnanensis Liu & Wang, 1977
Tabanus zancala (Philip, 1954)
Tabanus zayaensis Xu & Sun, 2007
Tabanus zayasi Cruz & García, 1974
Tabanus zayuensis Wang, 1982
Tabanus zebrinus Schuurmans Stekhoven, 1932
Tabanus zeirii Ježek, 1981
Tabanus zhongpingi Xu & Guo, 2005
Tabanus zimini Olsufiev, 1937
Tabanus zodiacus Burton, 1978
Tabanus zoster Philip, 1960
Tabanus zoulouensis (Bigot, 1892)
Tabanus zuhairi Al-Talafha, Yaakop, Nurul Fatihah & Idris, 2018
Tabanus zummingi Xu & Sun, 2007
Tabanus zythicolor Philip, 1936

References

Tabanus